The 1954 Tulsa Golden Hurricane football team represented the University of Tulsa during the 1954 college football season. In their second year under head coach Bernie Witucki, the Golden Hurricane compiled a 0–11 record, 0–4 against Missouri Valley Conference opponents, and finished in last place in the conference.

Schedule

References

Tulsa
Tulsa Golden Hurricane football seasons
College football winless seasons
Tulsa Golden Hurricane football